Hongdae may refer to:
 Hongik University, a university in Seoul, South Korea, known as Hongdae for short
 Hongdae, Seoul, an area of Seoul, named after the university